Chuquiraga arcuata is a species of flowering plant in the family Asteraceae. It is endemic to Ecuador. Its natural habitat is subtropical or tropical dry shrubland. It is threatened by habitat loss.

References

Barnadesioideae
Flora of Ecuador
Endangered plants
Taxonomy articles created by Polbot